South Fall Creek Township is one of twelve townships in Yadkin County, North Carolina, United States. The township had a population of 2,442 according to the 2000 census.

Geographically, South Fall Creek Township occupies  in central Yadkin County.

Townships in Yadkin County, North Carolina
Townships in North Carolina